Danielle Cadena Deulen (born 1979) is an American poet, essayist, and academic. She is also the host of the Literary radio program and podcast Lit from the Basement.

Biography
Danielle Cadena Deulen was born and raised in Portland, Oregon to Daniel Deulen and Cecilia Cadena. She is half-Latinx on her mother's side. Much of her early life is explored in her personal essay collection, The Riots.

Selected works
Deulen's first collection of poems, Lovely Asunder (U. of Arkansas Press, 2011), won the 2010 Miller Williams Arkansas Poetry Prize of the University of Arkansas Press, which subsequently published the book, and the 2012 Utah Book Award. The title Lovely Asunder was taken from Gerard Manley Hopkins' "The Wreck of the Deutschland."

The Riots (U. of Georgia Press, 2011)  is a book of essays which (under the judging of Luis Alberto Urrea) won the 2010 the AWP Prize in Creative Nonfiction. It also won the Great Lakes Colleges Association New Writers Award for Creative Nonfiction.

Honors and awards

 2018 Oregon Literary Fellowship, Oregon Literary Arts

References

External links
 

1979 births
Living people
21st-century American women writers
George Mason University alumni
University of Utah alumni
Writers from Portland, Oregon
Poets from Oregon
Willamette University faculty
University of Cincinnati faculty
21st-century American poets
American women poets
American women essayists
Hispanic and Latino American poets
Hispanic and Latino American academics
American women academics